Ercole (Hercules) Dembowski (12 January 1812 – 19 January 1881) was an Italian astronomer.

He was born in Milan. He inherited the title of "Baron" as the son of Jan Dembowski (Dębowski), one of Napoleon's Polish generals.  He served in the navy of Austria-Hungary until 1843 when he retired for health reasons to Naples.

He was a tireless observer of double stars and made tens of thousands of micrometer measurements.  In particular, he remeasured many double stars from Friedrich Struve's Dorpat Catalogue, noting how some of them had changed position over the years due to their mutual orbit as binary stars.

He won the Gold Medal of the Royal Astronomical Society in 1878.

The crater Dembowski on the Moon is named after him, as well as the minor planet 349_Dembowska.

References

External links
 Awarding of RAS gold medal: MNRAS 38 (1878) 249
 Obituary: MNRAS 42 (1882) 148
 Portrait of Ercole Dembowski from the Lick Observatory Records Digital Archive, UC Santa Cruz Library's Digital Collections

1812 births
1881 deaths
Scientists from Milan
Italian people of Polish descent
Clan of Jelita
Barons of Italy
Barons of Poland
19th-century Italian astronomers
Recipients of the Gold Medal of the Royal Astronomical Society